We the People, Volume 1 is the seventh studio album by American country rap artist Colt Ford. The album was released on September 20, 2019, through Ford's label Average Joes Entertainment. It includes the singles "We the People" and " Slow Ride".

Background
Ford stated that when making this album, he "let the feeling of the songs guide me", rather than attempting to follow supposed guidelines or unwritten rules.

Track listing

Charts

Release history

References

2021 albums
Colt Ford albums
Average Joes Entertainment albums